The 2013–14 Football League Trophy, known as the Johnstone's Paint Trophy for sponsorship reasons, was the 30th season in the history of the competition. It is a knock-out tournament for English football clubs in League One and League Two, the third and fourth tiers of the English Football League.

In all, 48 clubs entered the competition. It was split into two sections, Northern and Southern, with the winners of each section contesting the final at Wembley Stadium. Crewe Alexandra were the defending champions, but were eliminated in the Second Round.

Peterborough United of League One won the competition for the first time in their history, defeating League Two side Chesterfield in the final 3–1.

First round
The draw for the first round took place on 17 August 2013. Sixteen clubs were awarded a bye into the second round, and the remaining 32 clubs, including the holders, were divided into four geographical regions. All ties were played during the week commencing 2 September 2013.

Northern section
North-West

North-East

Byes
Carlisle United, Morecambe, Preston North End, Rochdale, Chesterfield, Mansfield Town, Rotherham United, York City.

Southern section
South-West

South-East

Byes
Crawley Town, Newport County, Oxford United, Swindon Town, Coventry City, Peterborough United, Southend United, Stevenage.

Second round
The draw for the second round took place on 7 September 2013. The sixteen clubs that progressed from the first round were joined by the sixteen that had been awarded a bye at that stage. All ties were played on 8 October 2013.

Northern section
North-West

North-East

Southern section
South-West

South-East

Area quarter-finals
The draw for the area quarter-finals took place on 12 October 2013, on Soccer AM. All ties to be played during the week commencing 11 November 2013.

Northern section

Southern section

Area semi-finals
The draw for the area semi-finals took place on 16 November 2013, on Soccer AM. All ties to be played during the week commencing 9 December 2013.

Northern section

Southern section

Area finals
The draw for the area finals took place on 11 December 2013. The first legs of the area finals will be played during the week commencing 3 February 2014. The second legs of the area finals will be played during the week commencing 17 February 2014.

Northern section

Southern section

Final

References

External links
Official Site

EFL Trophy
Trophy
Trophy
Football League Trophy